Ernest Edgar Stubbs (28 March 1883 – 13 September 1955) was an Australian rules footballer who played with Geelong in the Victorian Football League (VFL).

Family
The son of Albert Charles Stubbs (1856-1922), and Maria Stubbs (1862-1939), née Hazelgrove, Ernest Edgar Stubbs was born in Ballarat East, Victoria on 28 March 1883.

He married Eva Ethel Maud McDonald on 29 June 1925.

Football
On 4 July 1906, Stubbs was granted a clearance from Ballarat Imperial Football Club to play with Geelong, and he played his first match against Essendon on 7 July 1906. He played five games in all, with his last appearance in a team that was thrashed by South Melbourne, 14.17 (101) to 5.8 (38), on 4 August 1906.

In 1907 he was playing with the Golden Point Football Club in the Ballarat Football Association.

Death
He died at St George, Queensland on 13 September 1955.

Notes

References

External links 

1883 births
1955 deaths
Australian rules footballers from Victoria (Australia)
Geelong Football Club players
Beaufort Football Club players